Army Beach, Mazandaran ( – Plāzh-e Artash) is a village and military installation in Qareh Toghan Rural District, in the Central District of Neka County, Mazandaran Province, Iran. At the 2006 census, its population was 77, in 21 families.

References 

Populated places in Neka County
Military installations of Iran